Ravensdale Park is a civil parish in the Derbyshire Dales district of Derbyshire roughly  WSW of Belper, Derbyshire, England, midway between Turnditch and Brailsford. The population of the civil parish as taken at the 2011 Census was less than 100. Details are included in the South Derbyshire civil parish of Dalbury Lees.

It originated as one of the seven royal parks within Duffield Frith. In time it was the location of the chief hunting lodge for the Frith, and there are frequent entries in the records of the Duchy of Lancaster referring to it. John of Gaunt visited frequently. Parts of the former deer park are designated as a scheduled monument.

References

Civil parishes in Derbyshire
Derbyshire Dales